The Route Nationale No. 1 is an important highway in Niger. It connects the east part of the country to the west. The first large paved section, between Gouré and N'Guigmi, was surfaced in 1971–72. This section, in the distant and sparsely populated east, is now the most degraded section and in part completely eroded. It was named the "Route de l'Unité" ("the Unity Highway") in the 1970s. By 1980, it was joined by the second long all-weather road in Niger, the "Uranium Highway," running from Niamey to Arlit in the far north.

See also
Transport in Niger

References

Roads in Niger